Ben or Benjamin Shaw may refer to:
Ben Shaw (DJ), British house music producer, remixer and DJ
Ben Shaw (American football) (1893–?), American football guard
Ben Shaw (baseball) (1893–1959), Major League Baseball player
Ben Shaw (Labour activist) (1865–1942), British labour movement activist
Benjamin Shaw (musician), English musician
Benjamin Shaw (MP) (c. 1770–1843), English politician, MP for Westbury 1812–18
Benjamin Shaw (abolitionist), American abolitionist lecturer

See also
Ben Shore, a character in the TV series Free Willy